Pedro Pablo Pichardo Peralta (born 30 June 1993) is a Cuban-born Portuguese triple jumper who holds the current Olympic, World, and European titles.

Pichardo was the 2012 World Junior Champion and the 2013 World Championship silver medalist. His  in early 2014 was the best triple jump of the year. In 2015, his  made him the #6 performer ever. At club level, he represents Benfica in Portugal.

Career
On 15 May 2015, Pichardo jumped  (0.9 m/s) at the Qatar Athletic Super Grand Prix. His performance made him the number 3 performer ever at the time. With Christian Taylor also jumping  minutes later, this was the first competition in history to have two men jump over 18 m, being called "the greatest triple jump competition ever." Pichardo's 18.06 m also improved his own Cuban national record of  set one week earlier in Havana. That mark erased Yoelbi Quesada's nearly 18-year-old record, and put Pichardo in position #6 of the all-time top ten performers. Back in 2013, Pichardo had won Athletissima with a mark of 17.58 m.

On 28 May 2015, Pichardo jumped  (0.0 m/s) at the Copa Cuba-Memorial Barrientos meet in Havana, improving his own Cuban national record set two weeks earlier by 2 cm.

In April 2017, Pichardo disappeared from the Cuban national team's meeting in Stuttgart, Germany, appearing in Portugal days later. After signing a contract with Portuguese club S.L. Benfica on 27 April, he gained Portuguese citizenship on 7 December and was eligible to compete for Portugal on international stage since August 2019. Therefore, the first major competition in which Pichardo represented the Portuguese colours was the 2019 World Championships, finishing fourth in the final.

Pichardo established Portugal's triple jump record at 17.95 m during the 2018 IAAF Diamond League on 4 May 2018, winning a gold medal. He also won gold medals at the 2019 IAAF Diamond League, with a personal season best of 17.53 m, and at the 2020 IAAF Diamond League, with a mark of 17.40 m.

Representing Portugal, Pichardo won the gold medal at the 2021 European Athletics Indoor Championships on 7 March 2021. On 6 July, Pichardo jumped 17.92 m (+0.4) at the Gyulai István Memorial, beating Hugues Fabrice Zango.

On 5 August 2021, Pichardo competed in the 2020 Summer Olympics in Tokyo, Japan representing Portugal. He won the gold medal in the triple jump event and the country's fifth ever gold medal.

Achievements

Personal bests

All information taken from World Athletics profile.

Personal life
Pichardo is married to Arialis Gandulla, with whom he has a daughter, Rosalis Maria. His father, Jorge Pichardo, is his coach.

See also
Portugal at the Olympics

References

External links

 
 
 Outras Histórias. Salto para a vitória [Other Stories. Jump to victory] - RTP 

1993 births
Living people
Sportspeople from Santiago de Cuba
Cuban male triple jumpers
Defecting sportspeople of Cuba
Cuban emigrants to Portugal
Cuban expatriate sportspeople in Portugal
World Athletics Championships athletes for Cuba
World Athletics Championships winners
Pan American Games gold medalists for Cuba
Athletes (track and field) at the 2015 Pan American Games
Pan American Games medalists in athletics (track and field)
S.L. Benfica athletes
Olympic male triple jumpers
Portuguese male triple jumpers
Naturalised citizens of Portugal
Portuguese people of Cuban descent
Diamond League winners
Medalists at the 2015 Pan American Games
European Athletics Indoor Championships winners
Black Portuguese sportspeople
Athletes (track and field) at the 2020 Summer Olympics
Medalists at the 2020 Summer Olympics
Olympic gold medalists for Portugal
Olympic gold medalists in athletics (track and field)
Olympic athletes of Portugal
World Athletics Indoor Championships medalists
European Athletics Championships winners